Robert Andrew Loughnan (1 September 1841 – 14 September 1934) was a New Zealand farmer, journalist and politician. He was born in Patna, India on 1 September 1841. He emigrated with his father and his brothers to Australia at around 20 years of age. He was a Member of the New Zealand Legislative Council from 6 May 1907 (he was originally summoned on 22 January 1907, but was found to be disqualified) until 5 May 1914, which was the end of his seven-year term. Loughnan wrote a political biography of Joseph Ward.

He died in Wellington on 14 September 1934 and is buried at Karori Cemetery.

Bibliography

References

External links
 

1841 births
1934 deaths
New Zealand Liberal Party MLCs
New Zealand farmers
New Zealand journalists
Politicians from Patna
Burials at Karori Cemetery